The 216th New Jersey Legislature began on January 14, 2014, at the end of Chris Christie's first term as Governor of New Jersey, and ended on January 12, 2016, halfway through Chris Christie's second term as governor.

Background 
The elections for the 216th Legislature were held on November 5, 2013, alongside Chris Christie's landslide re-election. In the Assembly the composition didn't change while in the Senate the composition did not change either.

Composition

Assembly

Senate

Senate 
The Senate has 40 members, one for each district

Leadership
The leadership for the 216th legislative session, which started on January 14, 2014, is as follows:

Senators

† First appointed to the seat
1 O'Toole had previously served in the Senate from 2001 to 2002

Former members from this term

Committees and Committee Chairs, 2014-2015 Legislative Session
Committee chairs : (All are Democrats)

Assembly 
The Assembly has 80 members, two for each district.

Leadership 
Speaker: Vincent Prieto

Majority Leader: Louis Greenwald

Minority Leader: Jon Bramnick

Members

Former members from this term

Vacancies

Senate

Assembly

See also
 List of New Jersey state legislatures

References 

New Jersey Legislature
New Jersey General Assembly by session